Francis Arthur Fahy (29 September 1854 – 1935) was an Irish nationalist, songwriter and poet. He is probably best remembered as the composer of the evergreen "The Ould Plaid Shawl". He collaborated with various composers, including Alicia Adélaide Needham, an associate of the Royal Academy of Music.

Life
Fahy was born at Kinvara, County Galway, the son of Thomas Fahy, who came from the Burren area, and Celia Marlborough from Gort.

Songs
Songs composed by Fahy include the following:
"The Ould Plaid Shawl"
"The Queen of Connemara"
"I Gaily Gave My Heart Away"
"My Hearts Treasure"
"The Tide Full In"
"Galway Bay"
"Summer is Coming"
"The Bog Road"
"Rebel Heart"
"Little Mary Cassidy"

See also
List of Irish ballads
Music of Ireland
Irish Texts Society

References

External links
 Francis Fahy Society at Kinvara.com
 

1854 births
1935 deaths
Irish songwriters
Irish poets
Irish activists
People from County Galway
People from Kinvara